City line is an alternative name for City limits. It may also refer to:
 CityLine, a Canadian television program
 The neighborhood of City Line, Brooklyn in New York, USA
 Cityline (ISP), a Russian Internet provider
 City Line (Jerusalem), part of the line that divided the city of Jerusalem from 1948 to 1967

In rail transport
 The City Line (Merseyrail), a commuter rail route in Merseyside, England
 The Cardiff City Line, a commuter rail route in Cardiff, Wales
 The Cross-City Line, a suburban railway line in the West Midlands conurbation, England
 The City Branch of the London Underground's Northern line
 The London Underground's Hammersmith & City line 
 The London Underground's Waterloo & City line
 The Northern City Line (formerly the Great Northern and City Line), a National Rail line in London, England
 The Stockholm City Line, a railway tunnel beneath central Stockholm, Sweden

In road transport
 City Avenue or City Line Avenue, a highway in Philadelphia, USA
 City Line Avenue Bridge, a historic bridge carrying City Line Avenue
 City Line, an under construction bus rapid transit (BRT) line in Spokane, Washington, to be operated by Spokane Transit Authority
 Cityline New Zealand Ltd, the operator of the Valley Flyer (bus company) in New Zealand
 An obsolete trading name used by the Bristol Omnibus Company and later First Bristol in Bristol, England
 An obsolete trading name used by the Oxford Bus Company in Oxford, England

In water and air transport
 The Bristol City Line, a shipping line based in Bristol, England that traded from 1704 to 1974.
 CityLine Hungary, a Hungarian charter airline
 Lufthansa CityLine, a German regional airline

See also
 Cityliner